Gabriel (von) Hackl (24 March 1843 – 5 June 1926) was a German historicist painter.

Life and work 
He was born in Maribor, Lower Styria, Austrian Empire. A surgeon's son, he attended the gymnasium in his home town and the city school in Graz. To fulfil his father's wishes he then studied anatomy, archaeology and drawing at the University of Vienna. In 1865 he moved to Munich, at whose Akademie der Bildenden Künste he studied under Alexander Wagner and Carl Theodor von Piloty. He then took a place at the Münchner Kunstgewerbeschule and married Sophie Schmid.

In 1878 he became a professor and lecturer in drawing at the Münchner Kunstakademie, holding the position until 1919. His colleagues there included Franz von Stuck and Wilhelm von Diez. He was a member of the Luitpold-Gruppe, founded in 1896 as a sub-division of the Münchner Künstlergenossenschaft. The Luitpold-Gruppe also included Hugo Bürgel (its president), Walter Firle, Fritz Baer, Karl Marr, Johann Sperl and Wilhelm Leibl. Several artists trained by Hackl found success, though he had no lasting success with his own work, which still occasionally appears at auction.
He died on 5 June 1926, in Munich.

Notable pupils 

1880: Pius Ferdinand Messerschmitt
1884: Albin Egger-Lienz, Anton Ažbe
1885: Max Slevogt
1887: Richard Riemerschmid
1888: Leo Putz
1889: Wilhelm Thöny
1890: Franz Marc
1891: Hans von Hayek
1897: Hans Purrmann
1905: 
1914: Henry Ives Cobb, Jr

Works in public collections 
 Museum Georg Schäfer, Schweinfurt
 Kunsthistorisches Museum, Vienna
 Neue Pinakothek,  Munich
 Steiermärkisches Landesmuseum Joanneum, Graz

Exhibitions 
1891: Jahresausstellung der Genossenschaft der Bildenden Künstler Wiens und der Gesellschaft der Freunde Junger Kunst, Baden-Baden
2006: Zur Natur des Menschen. Genremalerei des 19. und frühen 20. Jahrhunderts, Neue Galerie am Landesmuseum Joanneum, Graz

Literature 
 Gabriel von Hackl. In: Ulrich Thieme, Felix Becker u. a.: Allgemeines Lexikon der Bildenden Künstler von der Antike bis zur Gegenwart. Band 15, E. A. Seemann, Leipzig 1922, S. 416

External links 

 Franz Hofstötter – Ausbildung. (PDF-Datei; 65 kB)

References 

1843 births
1926 deaths
19th-century German painters
German male painters
20th-century German painters
20th-century German male artists
19th-century Austrian painters
19th-century German male artists
Austrian male painters
Academic staff of the Academy of Fine Arts, Munich
Austrian nobility
German people of Austrian descent
Austrian emigrants to Germany
Artists from Maribor